Domenico Suriano (born 30 May 1988) is an Italian footballer who currently plays for Eccellenza Pugliese team U.S.D Corato Calcio.

Biography
Born in Andria, Apulia, Southern Italy, Suriano started his career at hometown club Andria BAT.
In summer 2006 he was loaned to Serie D club Bitonto. He scored his first goal in the 2006–07 season.

In 2008 Suriano left to join Pro Vasto, also in Serie D. In 2008–09 season his team gained promotion to Lega Pro Seconda Divisione. The following season he scored 6 goals in 22 appearances.

In the summer of 2010 he moved to Lecco, a Lega Pro Seconda Divisione team in Lombardy. In January 2011 he was loaned to Giulianova.

In December 2011 he left for Serie D team Fortis Trani. In that season he scored 3 goals in 12 appearances.

In November 2012 Suriano joined Lega Pro Seconda Divisione club Milazzo and, within a few months, became the team captain. At the end of the season Milazzo went out of business.

In October 2013 he joined Serie D team Pomigliano. In 2014, he won the Coppa Italia Serie D.

Honours

Club
Coppa Italia Serie D: 2013–14

External links
 

Italian footballers
S.S. Fidelis Andria 1928 players
Vastese Calcio 1902 players
Calcio Lecco 1912 players
Giulianova Calcio players
S.S. Milazzo players
Cavese 1919 players
S.S. Chieti Calcio players
A.C. Bellaria Igea Marina players
Mantova 1911 players
Serie D players
Association football forwards
1988 births
Living people